The men's 100 metres at the 2005 World Championships in Athletics was held at the Helsinki Olympic Stadium on August 6 and August 7.

The top three runners in each of the initial 8 heats automatically qualified for the second round.  The next ten fastest runners from across the heats also qualified.  Those 32 runners competed in 4 heats in the second round, with the top three runners from each heat and the single next fastest runner qualifying for the semifinals.  There were two semifinal heats, and only the top four from each heat advanced to the final.

Medals

Results
All times shown are in seconds.
Q denotes qualification by place.
q denotes qualification by time.
DNS denotes did not start.
DNF denotes did not finish.
AR denotes area record
NR denotes national record.
PB denotes personal best.
SB denotes season's best.

Round 1
August 6

Round 1, Heat 1
  Francis Obikwelu, Portugal 10.17 s Q
  Shawn Crawford, United States 10.23 s Q
  Simone Collio, Italy 10.27 s Q
  Nicolas Macrozonaris, Canada 10.40 s q (SB)
  Philam Garcia, Guam 10.79 s
  Derrick Atkins, Bahamas 11.57 s
  Harmon Harmon, Cook Islands 11.84 s (SB)
  Mariuti Uan, Kiribati 11.92 (PB)

Round 1, Heat 2
  Ronald Pognon, France 10.15 s Q
  Ainsley Waugh, Jamaica 10.16 s Q (PB)
  Olusoji Fasuba, Nigeria 10.19 s Q
  Guus Hoogmoed, Netherlands 10.31 s q
  Łukasz Chyła, Poland 10.39 s q
  Shameer Ayub, Singapore 10.82 s (SB)
  Chi Kun Au, Macau 11.11 s
  Khalid Brooks, Anguilla DNS

Round 1, Heat 3
  Dwight Thomas, Jamaica 10.15 s Q
  Patrick Johnson, Australia 10.20 s Q (SB)
  Darrel Brown, Trinidad and Tobago 10.25 s Q
  Matic Osovnikar, Slovenia 10.40 s q
  Markus Pöyhönen, Finland 10.49 s
  Souhalia Alamou, Benin 10.90 s (SB)
  Wally Kirika, Papua New Guinea 11.01 s
  Domeio Kabua, Marshall Islands DNS

Round 1, Heat 4
  Justin Gatlin, United States 10.16 s Q
  Joshua Ross, Australia 10.28 s Q
  Nobuharu Asahara, Japan 10.40 s Q
  Mark Lewis-Francis, Great Britain 10.40 s q
  Leigh Julius, South Africa 10.51 s
  Darrel Roligat, Northern Mariana Islands 11.49 s
  Daraphirit Sam, Cambodia 11.85 s

Round 1, Heat 5
  Leonard Scott, United States 10.12 s Q
  Uchenna Emedolu, Nigeria 10.17 s Q
  Jacey Harper, Trinidad and Tobago 10.31 s Q
  Obadele Thompson, Barbados 10.32 s q SB
  Pierre Browne, Canada 10.50 s
  Deamo Baguga, Nauru 11.64 s (PB)
  Phomma Kheuabmavong, Laos 11.83 s

Round 1, Heat 6
  Marlon Devonish, Great Britain 10.25 s Q
  Marc Burns, Trinidad and Tobago 10.42 s Q
  Churandy Martina, Netherlands Antilles 10.46 s Q
  Tlhalosang Molapisi, Botswana 10.71 s
  Yazaldes Nascimento, São Tomé and Príncipe 11.07 s (SB)
  John Howard, Federated States of Micronesia 11.24 s (SB)
  Ali Shareef, Maldives 11.44 s
  Eric Pacome N'Dri, Côte d'Ivoire DNF

Round 1, Heat 7
  Kim Collins, Saint Kitts and Nevis 10.31 s Q
  Michael Frater, Jamaica 10.32 s Q
  Idrissa Sanou, Burkina Faso 10.43 s Q
  Salem Mubarak Al-Yami, Saudi Arabia 10.45 s  q
  Juan Sainfleur, Dominican Republic 10.47 s  q
  Rolando Palacios, Honduras 10.73 s (NR)
  Wilfried Bingangoye Gabon 10.86 s (SB)
  Darren Gilford, Malta 10.89 s

Round 1, Heat 8
  Jason Gardener, Great Britain 10.19 s Q SB
  Aziz Zakari, Ghana 10.30 s Q
  Deji Aliu, Nigeria 10.36 s Q
  Daniel Bailey, Antigua and Barbuda 10.49 s
  Fonseca Neto, Angola 11.01 s (PB)
  Reginaldo Micha Ndong, Equatorial Guinea 11.57 s
  Christie van Wyk, Namibia DNS

Round 2
August 6

Round 2, Heat 1
  Justin Gatlin, United States 10.27 s Q
  Dwight Thomas, Jamaica 10.28 s Q
  Aziz Zakari, Ghana 10.41 s Q
  Patrick Johnson, Australia 10.48 s
  Mark Lewis-Francis, Great Britain 10.53 s
  Nobuharu Asahara, Japan 10.58 s
  Simone Collio, Italy 10.60 s
  Łukasz Chyła, Poland DNS

Round 2, Heat 2
  Leonard Scott, United States 10.19 s Q
  Olusoji Fasuba, Nigeria 10.24 s Q
  Marc Burns, Trinidad and Tobago 10.29 s Q
  Kim Collins, Saint Kitts and Nevis 10.32 s q
  Ainsley Waugh, Jamaica 10.39 s
  Churandy Martina, Netherlands Antilles 10.48 s
  Guus Hoogmoed, Netherlands 10.51 s
  Juan Sainfleur, Dominican Republic 10.74 s

Round 2, Heat 3
  Francis Obikwelu, Portugal 10.19 s Q
  Shawn Crawford, United States 10.25 s Q
  Jason Gardener, Great Britain 10.31 s Q
  Joshua Ross, Australia 10.31 s q
  Deji Aliu, Nigeria 10.39 s
  Jacey Harper, Trinidad and Tobago 10.39 s
  Matic Osovnikar, Slovenia 10.48 s
  Nicolas Macrozonaris, Canada 10.48 s

Round 2, Heat 4
  Darrel Brown, Trinidad and Tobago 10.10 s Q
  Ronald Pognon, France 10.11 s Q
  Michael Frater, Jamaica 10.12 s Q
  Uchenna Emedolu, Nigeria 10.16 s q
  Marlon Devonish, Great Britain 10.20 s q
  Obadele Thompson, Barbados 10.34 s
  Salem Mubarak Al-Yami, Saudi Arabia 10.48 s
  Idrissa Sanou, Burkina Faso 10.80 s

Semifinals
August 7

Semifinal 1
  Leonard Scott, United States 10.08 s Q
  Michael Frater, Jamaica 10.09 s Q
  Marc Burns, Trinidad and Tobago 10.12 s Q
  Francis Obikwelu, Portugal 10.13 s Q
  Olusoji Fasuba, Nigeria 10.18 s
  Marlon Devonish, Great Britain 10.24 s
  Joshua Ross, Australia 10.27 s
  Shawn Crawford, United States 10.28 s

Semifinal 2
  Justin Gatlin, United States 9.99 s Q
  Aziz Zakari, Ghana 10.00 s Q
  Dwight Thomas, Jamaica 10.06 s Q
  Kim Collins, Saint Kitts and Nevis 10.07 s Q
  Jason Gardener, Great Britain 10.08 s (SB)
  Uchenna Emedolu, Nigeria 10.16 s
  Darrel Brown, Trinidad and Tobago 10.16 s
  Ronald Pognon, France 10.17 s

Final
August 7
  Justin Gatlin, United States 9.88 s (SB)
  Michael Frater, Jamaica 10.05 s
  Kim Collins, Saint Kitts and Nevis 10.05 s
  Francis Obikwelu, Portugal 10.07 s
  Dwight Thomas, Jamaica 10.09 s
  Leonard Scott, United States 10.13 s
  Marc Burns, Trinidad and Tobago 10.14 s
  Aziz Zakari, Ghana 10.20 s

References

External links
IAAF results, round 1
IAAF results, round 2
IAAF results, semi final
IAAF results, final

100m
100 metres at the World Athletics Championships